Robert Kenneth Beausoleil (born November 6, 1947) is an American murderer and associate of Charles Manson and members of his communal Manson Family. He was convicted and sentenced to death for the July 27, 1969 fatal stabbing of Gary Hinman, who had befriended him and other Manson associates. Beausoleil was later granted commutation to a lesser sentence of life imprisonment, after the Supreme Court of California issued a ruling that invalidated all death sentences issued in California prior to 1972.

During his incarceration in the California state prison system, Beausoleil has recorded and released music. He has also worked on visual art, instrument design, and media technology. Although a parole board recommended him for parole in January 2019 in his 19th hearing for eligibility, the recommendation was denied by the Governor of California.

Early life
Beausoleil was born on November 6, 1947, in Santa Barbara, California, to working-class parents Charles Kenneth Beausoleil and Helen Arlene Mattox. He was the first-born child in a Catholic family and has four siblings. When he was 15, Beausoleil was sent to Los Prietos Boys Camp for ten months for running away from home and a series of juvenile pranks. After he was released, Beausoleil moved to the Los Angeles area and drifted between there and San Francisco, gravitating towards the emerging counterculture music scene and acting. He became a member of several rock bands beginning about 1965, including The Orkustra, The Milky Way, and The Grass Roots (other members later became Love). In 1967, he met Kenneth Anger and secured a part in Anger's film Lucifer Rising. 

In 1968, Beausoleil was living with Gary Hinman in Topanga Canyon when he met Charles Manson. He became associated with Manson and the communal group known as the "Manson Family".

Murder of Gary Hinman
According to Los Angeles prosecutor Vincent Bugliosi in his book Helter Skelter, Gary Hinman was killed over an issue of money and property that Manson believed Hinman had, and that Manson felt the Family was owed for a Hinman-supplied Beausoleil drug deal gone bad. At Beausoleil's second trial, prosecutors said it had been rumored that Hinman had received a $20,000 inheritance. According to the Los Angeles District Attorney's Office, the slaying became the first in a series of murders committed by the "Family" that set in motion the "Helter Skelter" scenario, which Manson envisioned and preached would happen in the near future in America. 

Accompanying Beausoleil that night were Susan Atkins and Mary Brunner. Brunner was granted legal immunity as the key witness for Beausoleil's prosecution. Atkins subsequently became involved in the infamous Tate-LaBianca murders and other crimes perpetrated by Manson and his family.

Beausoleil went with Atkins and Brunner to Hinman's house in Topanga Canyon, where Beausoleil had lived briefly. They demanded that Hinman give them money, but Hinman said that he did not have any money to give. Beausoleil called Manson at Spahn Ranch and said there was no money. Manson told them to hold Hinman captive at his house and convince him to get the money before Manson arrived.

Bruce Davis drove Manson to the Topanga Canyon home, taking a samurai sword or bayonet. Manson struck Hinman with the sword, severely cutting his face and ear. Some accounts said that he cut off part of Hinman's ear. Beausoleil said he stitched up Hinman's ear with dental floss; other reports say the stitching was done by Atkins and Brunner. Hinman begged for medical attention, but he was held captive at the house and tortured for three days before being killed. Manson told Beausoleil to kill Hinman and to make it look as if the crime had been committed by black revolutionaries, as part of his ideology that a race war was imminent and part of what he called "Helter Skelter". Beausoleil stabbed Hinman to death while Hinman, a devotee of Buddhism, repeated a Buddhist chant. As Hinman lay dying, Beausoleil, Atkins and Brunner took turns smothering him with a pillow. 

After killing Hinman, Beausoleil wrote the words "Political piggy" on a wall in Hinman's blood, in an attempt to lead police to believe the murder was done by a group of radicals. He dipped his hand in Hinman's blood and left a paw print, attempting to symbolize The Black Panthers as another way to mislead investigators about Hinman's murder.  Beausoleil drove away in Hinman's Fiat. He was arrested on August 6, 1969, after falling asleep in the car, having pulled off the highway at Cuesta Grade, a steep segment of U.S. Route 101 between San Luis Obispo and Atascadero.

In a jailhouse interview twelve years after the murder, Beausoleil asserted that the killing was the result of a drug transaction gone wrong. No reference to a drug deal was made in either of Beausoleil's two trials for the murder or in related books by Ed Sanders and Vincent Bugliosi. According to his 1981 interview published in Oui magazine, Beausoleil first said he had unknowingly supplied members of the Straight Satans motorcycle gang with a batch of bad mescaline, sold to him by Hinman, and the bikers had demanded their money back. In that interview, he denied that Manson had come to the Hinman residence. Beausoleil said that he had cut Hinman's face himself with a knife during a struggle over a gun. In 1998 he reversed himself about that element of the assault.{{failed verification|date=April 2019|reason=I see no mention of either Hinman or Manson in that article. I see that there is another article in 'Seconds magazine cited in 1999. Is this meant to be a reference to that one? Where is a link to that one?}} 

Conspirator Susan Atkins stated before her death that she never heard Beausoleil indicate that a drug transaction was related at all to why they went to Hinman's house seeking money from him.

Conviction, life in prison, and parole hearings
On April 18, 1970, a Superior Court jury in Los Angeles found the 22-year-old Beausoleil guilty of first-degree murder of Hinman and sentenced him to death. Beausoleil's 18-year-old girlfriend Kathryn "Kitty" Lutesinger had testified against him during the trial; she was then pregnant by him and later gave birth to their daughter. The daughter would be cared for by Lutesinger's parents.

In 1972, following the Supreme Court of California ruling (in the case of People v. Anderson) that the prevailing death penalty statutes were unconstitutional, Beausoleil's sentence was commuted to life imprisonment. 

Called as a witness at a 1973 sanity hearing for four other Manson associates, Beausoleil said that he and they would not conform to society's standards of sane behavior. He said, 
"I'm at war with everybody in this courtroom. It's nothing personal but the world has been gattling at my brothers and sisters and as long as they are ripping off our world, our friends and our children, you better pray I never get out."

Beausoleil's initial parole suitability hearing was held on August 15, 1978. Prior to 2019, he had a total of 18 suitability hearings; each time the parole board rejected his bid for parole. . December 22, 2008.

Beausoleil attracted some women admirers while in prison. In 1980, he married a 21-year-old fan with whom he had corresponded. Within a year, she sought to annul the marriage, saying he had also been involved with other women.

On April 15, 1982, while incarcerated, Beausoleil was stabbed by other prisoners. After that point he reportedly began to lose his sense of loyalty to Manson and distance himself more from the "family". He ceased to justify their actions and expressed more regret about what they had done.

In 1994, he requested and was transferred to the Oregon State Penitentiary. His wife, Barbara, whom he had met while in California, moved to Oregon to be near him.  Bobby and Barbara had no children together, but she had children from a former marriage.
Following the death of his wife and having committed a disciplinary infraction in the Oregon prison, he was transferred back to California in 2015, to the California Medical Facility in Vacaville.

His parole bid was denied in 2016 in part because he was said to have been recording music for sale without permission from the California authorities. Oregon authorities had given him such permission, according to Gary Hinman's cousin Kay Hinman Martley and Sharon Tate's sister Debra Tate. These family members of victims of the Manson murders had been involved in the parole hearings and continued to oppose the release of Beausoleil.

On January 3, 2019, a panel of commissioners of the California Board of Parole recommended that Beausoleil be freed on parole. In recommending parole, the panel cited Beausoleil's youthful offender status as having been a mitigating factor in his crime. They noted that, during his nearly half-century of incarceration, he had pursued creative outlets and pro-social growth, gradually maturing into a person exhibiting compassion and empathy. The Los Angeles District Attorney's office disagreed, saying that the panel's recommendation was "unfortunate".

Kay Martley and Debra Tate also continued to oppose granting parole. Martley stated "this man does not belong outside the walls of prison." Debra Tate repeated the allegation that Beausoleil had been violating prison rules by profiting from the sale of his music and art while in prison. She started a petition on Change.org to ask the governor to deny him parole. Beausoleil's attorney responded to the comment about the music and art activities by saying that "Everything he has produced so far was done with the full permission of the warden of his prior institutions."

As has been the case for several other Manson associates, the Governor of California Gavin Newsom denied Beausoleil's parole recommendation on April 26, 2019, saying he felt that Beausoleil's release could still pose a danger to society.

As of 2022, only one person who has been convicted of murder in the killings committed by the Family has been released from prison: Steve "Clem" Grogan, who was paroled in 1985. Several others, including Manson and Atkins, have died in prison. Bruce Davis remains incarcerated after having had seven recommendations for parole denied by California governors.

Private life
Beausoleil has three biological children.

Film roles
Beausoleil was to star in Kenneth Anger's 1967 version of the film Lucifer Rising, but little footage was shot before the two had a falling out, and the project was abandoned. Some of the footage was later used in Invocation of My Demon Brother (and again in the resurrected Lucifer Rising film). Beausoleil appeared in a western-styled softcore porn film titled The Ramrodder (a.k.a. Savage Passion), which also featured his friend Catherine Share. Share later became a full-fledged member of the Manson Family. This film was shot at a small ranch in Topanga Canyon.

Beausoleil at the age of 16 had a brief appearance as Cupid in the 1967 film Mondo Hollywood, a documentary about the social, political, and cultural climate of Los Angeles. It included a wide cast of Hollywood figures, including hair stylist Jay Sebring, who would later become a Manson Family murder victim himself.

Beausoleil, with his prison band The Freedom Orchestra, completed his soundtrack for Kenneth Anger's Lucifer Rising in 1979. The film premiered in New York in 1980.

Music career
In 1965, Beausoleil was a member of Arthur Lee's band the Grass Roots. (This is not to be confused with the San Francisco Bay area recording artists of the same name.) To avoid confusion, Lee's group later changed its name to "Love". Beausoleil has claimed that Lee told him the band was named Love in reference to one of Bobby's nicknames "Cupid". 

In early 1966, Beausoleil formed a band called The Orkustra. Bandmate violinist David LaFlamme later had success with his single "It's a Beautiful Day".

Incarcerated for most of his adult life, Beausoleil has nonetheless produced a significant body of musical recordings, visual art, and writings. Among his most notable works is the soundtrack for the indie-underground film Lucifer Rising by filmmaker Kenneth Anger. This is a prog-rock symphony describing a fallen angel's mythical journey. To perform and record his score, Beausoleil put together The Magick Powerhouse of Oz band while in prison during the 1970s. 

The official Beausoleil soundtrack was originally released on LP by Lethal Records in 1980. A later 2004 CD, on the Arcanum label, included archival material from The Orkustra and The Magick Powerhouse of Oz. The Lucifer Rising Suite was released on The Ajna Offensive in 2009 and 2013. This anthology documents the Lucifer Rising soundtrack project from its beginnings in 1967 to its completion and delivery to the filmmaker in 1979. In addition to the soundtrack, some alternate themes, musical and soundscape experiments, and live performances are contained in the boxed set. In 2014, a CD version of the anthology boxed set was released.

Beausoleil has subsequently composed and recorded additional original music albums. These have often correlated to his drawings and paintings. In 2014, a compilation titled Whispers Through The Black Veil was released on the Wyrd War label. It contains the song "The Wailing On Witch Mountain", which he composed, performed and recorded in 2012. His most recent musical release is Voodoo Shivaya (2018), a 2-disk concept album recorded between 2008 and 2015. It features both covers and original songs with vocal and instrumental tracks showcasing Beausoleil's instrumental and vocal skills. Guest performances, with the approval of the Oregon State Penitentiary administration, included Annabel Lee Moynihan, Michael Jenkins Moynihan, Robert Ferbrache, and Mike Behrenhausen, all members of the dark folk band Blood Axis. The triple gatefold LP and CD packaging integrates Nicholas Syracuse's photography with calligraphy by Timo Ketola.

Interviews
Truman Capote interviewed Beausoleil in 1972, while the latter was imprisoned in San Quentin State Prison. Capote published the interview in the form of a short story "Then It All Came Down", included in his 1980 book Music for Chameleons. According to his biographers, Capote believed his memory to be infallible and did not keep notes. Following the book's publication, Beausoleil said that Capote took gross literary license in his reporting of the interview from eight years earlier.

Filmography
 1967: Mondo Hollywood 1969: The Ramrodder 1969: Invocation of My Demon Brother 1972: Lucifer Rising (released 1980) – soundtrack composer

Discography
Studio albums
 1981: Lucifer Rising (reissued in 2005 and 2016)
 1997: Running with the White Wolf 1998: Mantra: Soundscapes for Meditation
 2001: Orb 
 2002: 7 
 2009: The Orkustra: Experiments in Electric Orchestra from the San Francisco Psychedelic Underground, 1966-67
 2013: Dancing Hearts Afire EU LP (reissued on CD in 2016)
 2014: Orb EU LP
 2018: Voodoo Shivaya LP and CD

Compilations
 2007: Dreamways of the Mystic, Vol. 1
 2007: Dreamways of the Mystic, Vol. 2
 2009: The Lucifer Rising Suite (4-LP Boxed Set) Reissued in 2013.
 2014: The Lucifer Rising Suite CD boxed set

Singles
 2013: "Red House"
 2014: "OM's Law"
 2014: "Angel"
 2014: "Who Do You Love"
 2015: "Ghost Highway"

References

External links
Official website

Exposés Review of The Lucifer Rising Suite CD

Official YouTube Channel
Plethoramag.com
It's Psychedelic Baby! Magazine Interview with Bobby BeauSoleil
Bobby BeauSoleil: Lucifer Rising for Bardo Methodology
Bobby BeauSoleil Interview for Bardo Methodology
Bobby BeauSoleil on Spotify

1947 births
Living people
American male film actors
Male murderers
American people convicted of murder
1969 murders in the United States
Male actors from Santa Barbara, California
Musicians from California
Manson Family
People from Santa Barbara, California
American prisoners sentenced to death
Crimes involving Satanism or the occult
Prisoners sentenced to death by California
People convicted of murder by California